Aircraft cavern, a calque of the German word Flugzeugkaverne, is an underground hangar amongst others used by the Swiss Air Force.

Historical

During World War II, the neutral Swiss military airfields were for the first time equipped with simple arched concrete U-43 type shelters to protect the aircraft parked underneath. After World War II, starting in 1947, these open objects became even better protected with steel doors, thus creating the U-68 type shelter.

Shortly after World War II and the beginning of the Cold War with the possible escalation between the nuclear superpowers of the Eastern and Western blocks, the Swiss Air Force began to develop concepts for defending their neutrality in the case of a conflict. In the 1940s, the Swiss army had already built so-called retablierstollen (re-equipping caves) at some airfields. These retablierstollen consisted of 100m long straight tunnels excavated in the rock, making it possible to store and eventually re-arm small Swiss fighter aircraft such as the then used Messerschmitt Bf 109 and the Morane-Saulnier M.S.406. The dimensions of these tunnels are comparable to an autobahn tunnel.

The airfields chosen were Alpnach, Buochs, Meiringen, St.Stephan and Saanen, all located in the Alps with a lot of cover in the vicinity of the runway so that the aircraft could be out of sight within minutes after touchdown.

In the early 1950s, the first large-scale excavations in rock took place, creating more space in the existing caves. The expanded space created by these excavations was now used to service the aircraft and to execute some minor repairs. The first large-scale constructions inside the caves were at the airfields of Ambrì, Alpnach, Buochs, Meiringen, Raron and Turtmann, starting operations from 1951 to 1954.

As the Swiss air force modernized and changed its aircraft during the 1960s, the excavations, now called cavernes, were further modernized and extended. Underground command and communication posts were constructed together with ammunition and fuel storage facilities, generator and technical rooms to keep the facility running, as well as personnel quarters.

The cavernes have been used to shelter and service the following aircraft types:
 de Havilland DH 100 Vampire
 de Havilland DH 112 Venom
 Hawker Hunter F Mk 58
 Dassault Mirage IIIS / RS
 Northrop F-5E Tiger II
 McDonnell Douglas F/A-18C Hornet

BAe Hawk aircraft and Alouette III helicopters have only temporarily been stored in cavernes after being withdrawn from service and then sold to third parties.

Design and construction

A Swiss cavern has space to hold 22 F-5 Tiger aircraft. The outside door usually consists of composite material, steel with a wooden core. The door is defended by personnel in a hardened bunker covering it with machineguns, making the outside door small arms and hand grenade proof. Past the door is an S-shaped tunnel making it nearly impossible to fire on the main blast doors. The blast doors are made of concrete reinforced steel and as long as they are closed, the aircraft parking area remains fully CBRN protected.

There are two or more tunnels. The first tunnel provides space for eleven aircraft and is equipped to handle major overhauls such as engine replacements. The aircraft are moved by lifting them by cranes. Once they are on the crane, they can be moved through the whole length of the tunnel. There is a linking tunnel  to the weapon storage area (WSA) which is extra protected by a sealed door. In case of fire the weapon storage may be filled with inert Halon gas to prevent fire and explosions. The WSA not only holds the munitions needed to re-arm the aircraft (missiles and cannon shells) but also the small arms ammunition for all military working in the caverne.
 
On the opposite side of the WSA is the command facility holding the workshops to service all aircraft systems, the communications cell, briefing room, kitchen, food & water storage, mess, personnel quarters and no-break generators to maintain electrical power under all circumstances. The command facility is also protected by hermetically sealed doors when working under CBRN conditions.

Next to the command tunnel is another tunnel with the same dimensions as the first one.  This one is also capable of holding eleven aircraft.

Fuel storage is located behind all tunnels allowing the cavern to sustain 22 aircraft for about 10 days without re-supplying of electricity, fuel, ammunition etc. from the outside world.

Operational use
The Swiss air force operates from Alpnach Air Base, Dübendorf Air Base, Militärflugplatz Emmen, Meiringen air base, Locarno Airport, Payerne Air Base and Sion Airport.

Meiringen is the only airfield with fully operational cavernes. The caverne at Meiringen was extended and refurbished for about 120 million Swiss Francs to comply to the needs of the current Swiss airforce F/A-18 fighters. Because of the weight of these aircraft hanging them in overhead cranes would be enormously expensive so that was not considered a viable option. Instead an extra tunnel had to be built. The tunnels are connected by some linking tunnels and extra dispersals were added on the opposite walls of each tunnel making it possible to operate 22 F/A-18s. The aircraft are able to roll in and out at the same time without the need of moving parked aircraft.  A linking tunnel constructed  directly before the main blast doors makes it possible to refuel and rearm an aircraft immediately after its mission without opening the main blast doors.  A very important issue when a unit is working under CBRN conditions. The Meiringen caverne ammo storage has an extra tunnel to the outside.

The former cavernes at Alpnach, Ambrì, Raron and Turtmann have been deactivated and closed. The caverne at Buochs Airport has been mothballed but it is estimated that the facility could be reactivated to operate F-5's within two months.

Origin
Originally, the plan for the aircraft cavern started its life as a design for "cavern airfields". High costs and technical difficulties prevented these from realization. The idea of using roads as runways, known as highway strips, was later part of the design demands for the Swiss motorway network.

Other countries
Other countries that have aircraft shelters built inside mountains on their territory include Albania, Bosnia and Herzegovina, Croatia, the People's Republic of China, Italy, Serbia, Montenegro, Norway, North Korea, Iran  and Sweden.

See also
  Underground hangar

References

Sources and references
 Aeronautica / Flugwehr - und - Technik/ mag.1969. 
 Brochure 2010 Militärische Denkmäler im Bereich Luftwaffe.  
 Jubilee book 50 Jahre Flugplatz Meiringen 
 www.zone-interdite.net/ 
 Uno Zero Zero – Ein Jahrhundert Schweizer Luftwaffe. Aeropublications, Teufen/ZH 2013, 
 Book 25 Jahre Fliegerbrigade 32 . Fl Br32 1990.

External links
 Swiss Airforce web
 YouTube footage Buochs caverne
 YouTube pictures of all cavernes

Aircraft hangars
Swiss Air Force

de:Flugzeugkaverne